Created in 1981 9.0 by the U.S. greeting card company American Greetings, the Care Bears are a group of characters that have appeared in various media.  Since early 1983, various companies in the Americas, Europe and Israel have published books based on the franchise.  In the United States, the Care Bears' books have been available through Random House, Parker Brothers and Scholastic Books.

English-language books

Parker Brothers
Parker Brothers, a board game company then owned by General Mills, launched its book publishing division in February 1983; its first series consisted of six books featuring the Care Bears.  Various authors contributed to the resulting series, Tales from the Care Bears; Tom Cooke illustrated most of the stories.  At the time of publication, various trade publications took note of Parker Brothers' unique marketing strategy for the books.  On October 30, 1987, Great Britain's Octopus Books released a book under this title, containing Amelia Hubert's Sweet Dreams for Sally and Evelyn Mason's A Sister for Sam.

Parker Brothers spent US$1 million in advertising on the original six-book series, which was made to promote the Care Bears characters.  According to a company spokesperson, the stories would demonstrate "love, caring, dreams, happiness, friendship, wishes, and feelings".  The series made its debut at the 1983 American International Toy Fair, along with other Care Bears products.  John Keller, editorial director for the books, commented on their creation:

Tales from the Care Bears

Other books

Random House
In 1983, the U.S. publishing company Random House was granted paperback rights to books in the Care Bears franchise through American Greetings and General Mills, as Parker Brothers was unable to secure the exclusive publishing rights at the time.  Bruce Jones, a Parker Brothers staffer, could not secure the exclusive publishing rights, and had to settle for a split license with Random House.  During the mid-1980s, Dorsey Laboratories promoted its Triaminic cough medicine through a Random House publication, The Care Bears Help Chase Colds; this promotion helped sell over 2 million units of the product, along with a free copy of said book.

Scholastic Books
A few months after the 2002 relaunch of the Care Bears franchise, Scholastic Books published its first titles featuring the characters.

Spanish-language books
In 1984, Parker Brothers' Tales from the Care Bears made their appearance in Spain as the Un Cuento de Los Osos Amorosos series.  The titles in this version were published by that country's division of General Mills, and translated from the original English by Leopoldo Rodríguez Regueira.

In 1987, Montena D.L. published two books featuring the Care Bears: Juego con los Osos Amorosos and Dónde, cómo, qué.  That same year, Madrid's Mondadori published Feliz cumpleaños, Osos Amorosos.

French-language books

Tales from the Care Bears
France's division of General Mills published Danièle Laufer's translations of the Tales in 1984.

Other books

German-language books
The Tales from the Care Bears were also published in German in 1984.

Dutch-language books

Portuguese-language books
These titles were published by Brazil's Fundamento, under the local franchise name Ursinhos Carinhosos.

Danish-language books
These were published in 2004 by Denmark's K.E. Media, and translated by Søren Lampe.

Hebrew-language books
Around 1987, Israel's Modan published Hebrew versions of selected Tales from the Care Bears, marketed for this country as Sipur mi-sipure Dube'khpat li.  ʻIvri Shafrirah Zakai and Tom Ḳuḳ served as the translators.

Shafrirah Zakai wrote another four books featuring the characters, also from Modan: Dube'khpat li ṿe-taḥarut ha-kishronot, Dubeʼkhpat li ṿeha-beʻayah ha-ḳeṭanah, Dubeʼkhpat li ṿe-tahalukhat ha-ḳarnaval and Dubeʼkhpat li ṿeha-mirdaf aḥare ha-otsar.

Polish-language books
Urodziny urwisa, an Ewa Ziółkowska translation of an earlier French work by Imelda Heuschen, was published in 1994 by Warsaw's RTV.

Notes

References
General
 
 
 

Specific

Lists of books
Series of children's books
Books
Books about bears